East Missoula is a census-designated place (CDP) in Missoula County, Montana, United States. It is part of the 'Missoula, Montana Metropolitan Statistical Area'. The population was 2,157 at the 2010 census, an increase from its population of 2,070 in 2000.

Geography
East Missoula is located at  (46.875110, -113.941269).

Climate
This climatic region is typified by large seasonal temperature differences, with warm to hot (and often humid) summers and cold (sometimes severely cold) winters.  According to the Köppen Climate Classification system, East Missoula has a humid continental climate, abbreviated "Dfb" on climate maps.

Demographics

As of the census of 2010, there were 2,157 people, 795 households, and 519 families residing in the CDP. The population density was 1,514.1 people per square mile (583.4/km2). There were 828 housing units at an average density of 605.6/sq mi (233.4/km2). The racial makeup of the CDP was 93.57% White, 0.34% African American, 3.24% Native American, 0.48% Asian, 0.24% from other races, and 2.13% from two or more races. Hispanic or Latino of any race were 1.64% of the population.

There were 795 households, out of which 33.0% had children under the age of 18 living with them, 48.6% were married couples living together, 11.6% had a female householder with no husband present, and 34.6% were non-families. 26.2% of all households were made up of individuals, and 6.3% had someone living alone who was 65 years of age or older. The average household size was 2.50 and the average family size was 3.01.

In the CDP, the population was spread out, with 24.3% under the age of 18, 10.3% from 18 to 24, 31.8% from 25 to 44, 22.9% from 45 to 64, and 10.7% who were 65 years of age or older. The median age was 36 years. For every 100 females, there were 105.0 males. For every 100 females age 18 and over, there were 104.2 males.

The median income for a household in the CDP was $27,094, and the median income for a family was $38,464. Males had a median income of $26,150 versus $18,000 for females. The per capita income for the CDP was $13,333. About 7.6% of families and 13.6% of the population were below the poverty line, including 5.0% of those under age 18 and 8.8% of those age 65 or over.

References

Census-designated places in Missoula County, Montana
Census-designated places in Montana
Montana placenames of Native American origin